A pressure point is an area on the human body that may produce significant pain or other effects when manipulated.

Pressure point may also refer to:

Pressure point (first aid), a point on the body where direct pressure is applied to constrict blood flow in the event of bleeding
Acupuncture point, in traditional Chinese medicine
Varmam, the corresponding concept in Tamil traditional medicine and martial arts
"Reflex points", in reflexology

In popular culture 
Pressure Point (1962 film), starring Sidney Poitier and Bobby Darin
Pressure Point (2001 film), a Canadian film
Pressure Point (album), by Freestylers
"Pressure Point" (song), from The Zutons' 2004 album Who Killed...... The Zutons?
Pressure Points: Live in Concert, a 1984 live album by progressive rock band Camel